The following table ranks the tallest buildings in Anchorage, Alaska, USA that stand at least 150 feet (46 m) in height. There are currently 16 high-rise buildings in Anchorage meeting this requirement, the tallest being the 22 story, 296 foot (90m) Conoco-Phillips building which has held the title of tallest building in both Anchorage and Alaska since its completion in 1983.

Tallest buildings

Tallest under construction, proposed or cancelled

References

External links

 Robert B. Atwood Building home page
 JL Tower home page
 McKinley Tower home page
 188 Northern Lights home page
 Webcam shot of Anchorage from Denali Towers North, shows the BP Building
 Short history of the Hotel Captain Cook

History of Anchorage, Alaska

Tallest
Anchorage